Nordost Corporation is an American high-end audio company founded in 1991 by Joe Reynolds and based in Holliston, Massachusetts. Nordost manufactures and sells audio and video cables, interconnects and unique accessories to the audiophile market and is distributed in 72 countries.

Overview 
Nordost was founded in Massachusetts in 1991.  Nordost manufactures audio cables, power distribution systems, grounding systems and resonance control devices for the high-end market. Their original Flatline cable was the first flat loudspeaker cable to use FEP (Fluorinated Ethene Propylene). All Nordost cables use a flexible FEP insulation originally developed by DuPont. All Nordost products are manufactured at their facilities in the USA.

Nordost produces five ranges of cable products (Lifestyle, Leif, Norse 2, Valhalla 2, Odin Supreme Reference). In addition to power cables and interconnect cable, digital cable and loudspeaker the company also manufactures the QRT line of products. power purifiers and grounding systems and a line of Sort System vibration controlling devices. In 2014, Nordost introduced the first American-made HDMI cable. The Blue Heaven HDMI cable uses Nordost's proprietary Micro Mono-Filament construction and is DPL certified.

Claims and criticisms
On the webpage of a Nordost USB 2.0 cable, Nordost claims that it "is guaranteed to take your computer audio system to the next level". However, in a test report of the cable, the reviewer found no measurable difference in the output signal when used as an interconnect of a USB audio DAC, in comparison to a generic USB cable. In addition, the reviewer criticized the high price of the cable.

References 

Audio equipment manufacturers of the United States
Manufacturing companies based in Massachusetts